Ali Erdal Keser (born 20 June 1961) is a Turkish former professional footballer who is director of sport of Galatasaray. A forward, he played for Borussia Dortmund, Galatasaray, Sarıyer and the Turkey national team.

Career
Keser was born in Sivas, Turkey but his family moved to Hagen, West Germany, where he grew up. He began his youth career with SSV Hagen. Borussia Dortmund signed him when he was 17 years old and started with the regular squad at the age of 18. He transferred to Galatasaray in 1984–85 season and played there for two seasons. He returned to Borussia Dortmund for the 1986–87 season. He then signed for Sarıyer and became team captain. In 1989, he returned for a second spell at Galatasaray where he played until retirement in 1994.

He was the assistant manager for Eric Gerets at Galatasaray between 2007 and 2009. In May 2015 Keser was announced to be the new manager of Swiss outfit FC Wil.

Keser made 25 appearances for the Turkey national team from 1982 to 1991.

References

External links
 
 
 

Living people
1961 births
People from Sivas
Turkish footballers
Association football forwards
Turkey international footballers
Bundesliga players
Süper Lig players
Borussia Dortmund players
Galatasaray S.K. footballers
Sarıyer S.K. footballers
Turkish football managers
Turkish expatriate footballers
Turkish expatriate sportspeople in Germany
Expatriate footballers in Germany
Recipients of the Medal of the Order of Merit of the Federal Republic of Germany